ANJ may refer to: mm

Aviation
 Sault Ste. Marie Municipal Airport, FAA LID code
 Zanaga Airport, Republic of the Congo, IATA code

Media and entertainment
  (A Natural Jade), a disbanded Japanese female singing group with three members

Organizations
 ANJ Group, an American company
 ANJ, Autorité Nationale des Jeux, France's National Gaming Authority.

See also
 Anj